The Niels Bohr Institute (Danish: Niels Bohr Institutet) is a research institute of the University of Copenhagen. The research of the institute spans astronomy, geophysics, nanotechnology, particle physics, quantum mechanics and biophysics.

Overview
The institute was founded in 1921, as the Institute for Theoretical Physics of the University of Copenhagen, by the Danish theoretical physicist Niels Bohr, who had been on the staff of the University of Copenhagen since 1914, and who had been lobbying for its creation since his appointment as professor in 1916. On the 80th anniversary of Niels Bohr's birth – October 7, 1965 – the Institute officially became the Niels Bohr Institute. Much of its original funding came from the charitable foundation of the Carlsberg brewery, and later from the Rockefeller Foundation.

During the 1920s, and 1930s, the institute was the center of the developing disciplines of atomic physics and quantum physics. Physicists from across Europe (and sometimes further abroad) often visited the institute to confer with Bohr on new theories and discoveries. The Copenhagen interpretation of quantum mechanics is named after work done at the institute during this time.

Following his father's death in 1962, Aage Bohr succeeded him as director of the Niels Bohr Institute, a position he held until 1970. He remained active there until he retired in 1992.

On January 1, 1993, the institute was merged with the Astronomic Observatory, the Ørsted Laboratory and the Geophysical Institute. The new resulting institute retained the name Niels Bohr Institute.

Research sections
Research at the Niels Bohr Institute is organised in ten research sections covering a broad range of physics, i.e. astrophysics, biophysics, solid state physics, geophysics, particle physics and e-science.

Cosmic Dawn

The Cosmic Dawn Center is an Astronomy/Cosmology research center, founded as a collaboration between the University of Copenhagen and DTU Space of the Danish Technical University (DTU). The center is led by center director and NBI Professor Sune Toft and center co-director Thomas Greve, Professor at DTU and UCL. The main objective of the center is to investigate the period known as the Cosmic Dawn (the transition period following the Cosmic Dark Ages), i.e. the reionization of the Universe and the formation of the first galaxies, through observations as well as through theory and simulations.

Goals
Research conducted at the center is focused on the specific period in the history of the Universe known as the Cosmic Dawn. This largely unexplored period, 300-600 million years after the Big Bang is when the first stars, black holes, and galaxies are believed to have formed. Many of the observations used by the center originate from the Atacama Large Millimeter Array (ALMA), one of the more powerful telescopes in the world. In the future, the center aims to mainly use the James Webb Space Telescope and the Euclid Telescope of the European Space Agency (ESA). DAWN scientists were instrumental in the construction of three instruments (NIRSpec, MIRI and NIRISS) for the project, and will be involved in the analysis of the first data from the telescope.

Published research
As of April 18, 2020, DAWN authors have published at least 187 refereed papers garnering 1602 citations, which, among others, can be found at the NASA/ADS library.
 Observation of inverse Compton emission from a long γ-ray burst:
 Identification of strontium in the merger of two neutron stars:
 Signatures of a jet cocoon in early spectra of a supernova associated with a γ-ray burst:
 Stellar Velocity Dispersion of a Massive Quenching Galaxy at z = 4.01:

Medal of Honour

in 2010, the year of the 125th anniversary of the birth of Niels Bohr, the institute established the Niels Bohr Institute Medal of Honour. It is an annual award for "a particularly outstanding researcher who is working in the spirit of Niels Bohr: International cooperation and the exchange of knowledge".

The medal is made by Danish sculptor Rikke Raben for the Niels Bohr Institute. On the front is a portrait of Niels Bohr, the atom sign and stars. The illustration on the back is inspired by a quote from Bohr: What is it that we human beings ultimately depend on? We depend on our words. We are suspended in language. Our task is to communicate experience and ideas to others.
On the back of the medal: Unity of Knowledge – the title of a lecture given by Bohr at Columbia University in 1954. Nosce te ipsum is Latin and means "know thyself". This quote originates from the Oracle of Delphi, in the Temple of Apollo in Greece.

Recipients:
 2010: Leo Kadanoff
 2011: Andre Geim
 2012: Juan Ignacio Cirac Sasturain
 2013: Fabiola Gianotti
 2014: Glaciologist Jérôme Chappellaz
 2015: Astrophysicist Brian Schmidt
 2016: Gerard 't Hooft
 2017: 
 2019: David R. Nelson
 2020: Paul J. Steinhardt
 2021: Jun Ye

See also
 Niels Bohr
 Nano-Science Center (Copenhagen University)
 List of physics awards

References

External links
 Niels Bohr Institute (en) Niels Bohr Institutet (dk)
 Dark Cosmology Centre (en)
 Discovery Center (en)

External links
 
 The Niels Bohr Institute
 DTU Space

University of Copenhagen
Research institutes in Denmark
Physics institutes
Niels Bohr
Physics awards
Educational institutions established in 1921
1921 establishments in Denmark
Theoretical physics institutes